Marius Skuodis (born 9 August 1985) is a Lithuanian politician,  the Minister of Transport and Communications in the Šimonytė Cabinet.

Biography
He graduated from high school in 2004. In 2008 graduated from Vilnius University Institute of International Relations and Political Science with a bachelor's degree in Political Sciences. In 2010 he obtained a master's degree in European Studies at Vilnius University Institute of International Relations and Political Science. From 2012 he holds a second master's degree of Public Administration in Public and Economic Policy from the London School of Economics. Since 2018 he is PhD in Social Sciences.

From 2006 to 2010 he was a Member of the Board of the Lithuanian State Science and Studies Foundation.

Between 2008 and 2009 worked as a Chief Specialist of the European Union Policy Department of the Office of the Government of Lithuania.

Since 2009 until 2010 he was an Analyst at the Public Policy and Management Institute.

From 2012 to 2015 worked at the Bank of Lithuania as a Senior Specialist of the International Relations Department.

Since 2012 until 2016 he was a lecturer at the Vilnius University Institute of International Relations and Political Science.

Between 2015 and 2018 worked as the Director of the International Relations Department of the Bank of Lithuania.

From 2018 to 2020 he was Deputy Minister of Economy and Innovation of Lithuania.

References

Sources
 https://eimin.lrv.lt/lt/struktura-ir-kontaktai/vadovybe/marius-skuodis
 https://www.lrt.lt/naujienos/lietuvoje/2/1292085/laisves-partija-i-susisiekimo-ministrus-siulys-dabartini-ekonomikos-viceministra-skuodi

1985 births
21st-century Lithuanian politicians
Living people
Ministers of Transport and Communications of Lithuania